Blue Prince is a 2001 album by the Belgian Jazz guitarist Philip Catherine. He was accompanied by Hein van de Geyn (double bass,) Hans Van Oosterhout (drums) and Bert Joris (bugle, trumpet.) The album was well received by Jazz critiques, rosing Catherine's performance and saying that (he is) "one of the finest guitarists on the globe."

The album Blue Prince earned AMG Album Pick with four stars by Allmusic.

Reception of Blue Prince
Blue Prince received favourable reviews from a number of professional critics.
Ronnie D. Lankford, Jr. (Allmusic)
"Philip Catherine has had a distinguished career, and Blue Prince captures him in fine form."
Glenn Astarita (All About Jazz)
"Belgian guitarist Philip Catherine has performed with the creme de la creme of modern jazz and fusion. 
Blue Prince is a solid and expertly executed effort, as Catherine implicitly illustrates why he is one of the finest guitarists on the globe."
Don Williamson (All About Jazz)
"Catherine has managed to blend all of his seemingly disparate interests into a compelling whole on Blue Prince, a complete summary of his vast talents."

Track listing

Personnel
 Philip Catherine - Guitar
 Hein van de Geyn - Double bass
 Hans Van Oosterhout - Drums
 Bert Joris - Bugle, Trumpet

References

External links 
 Philip Catherine Official Site

2001 albums
Jazz fusion albums by Belgian artists
Post-bop albums
Philip Catherine albums